This list of highest bridges includes bridges with a deck height of at least .  The  of a bridge is the maximum vertical drop distance between the bridge deck (the road, rail or other transport bed of a bridge) and the ground or water surface beneath the bridge span.

Structural height and deck height 

The difference between tall and high bridges can be explained in part because some of the highest bridges are built across deep valleys or gorges. For example, (as of 8 February 2020) the Duge Bridge is the highest bridge in the world, but only the tenth tallest. This bridge spans a deep river gorge.

The Millau Viaduct is a cable-stayed bridge that is both tall (in structural height) and high (in deck height). The Millau Viaduct is (as of 8 February 2020) the tallest bridge, but only the twenty-sixth highest bridge in the world.

Completed bridges
The ranking of the highest bridges in the world, currently open for use. Bridges under construction or demolished are not included.

Under construction
The list below includes the highest bridges in the world currently under construction. Only bridges with a height of 200 metres (660 ft) or greater are included.

Timeline
The list below shows the historical progression of the highest bridge in the world.

Notes

References
 HighestBridges.com, Sakowski, Eric (Wiki)

 Others references

Highest
Bridges
Lists of construction records